Jim Ducharme (born 5 December 1953) is a Canadian water polo player. He competed in the men's tournament at the 1976 Summer Olympics.

References

External links
 

1953 births
Living people
Canadian male water polo players
Olympic water polo players of Canada
Water polo players at the 1976 Summer Olympics
Water polo players from Quebec City